Mehregan (also Romanized as Mehregān; also known as Mehrejān) is a village in Garkan-e Shomali Rural District, Pir Bakran District, Falavarjan County, Isfahan Province, Iran. At the 2006 census, its population was 1,265, in 323 families.

References 

Populated places in Falavarjan County